"I Don't Wanna Talk About Love" (titled without the "I" on the album) is a song by Danielle Brisebois, the third single off her 1994 album Arrive All Over You.

Single track listing
(all songs written by Danielle Brisebois and Gregg Alexander)
"I Don't Wanna Talk About Love" – 3:56
"Pretty Baby" – 4:01
"Promise Tomorrow Tonight" – 4:40

Gregg Alexander features on track 2 and 3

External links

 Danielle Brisebois lyrics
 NewRadicals.Us. Unofficial forum covering New Radicals, Gregg Alexander and Danielle Brisebois.

Danielle Brisebois songs
1995 singles
Songs written by Gregg Alexander
Songs written by Danielle Brisebois
Song recordings produced by Gregg Alexander
1994 songs
Epic Records singles